The Minor Metals Trade Association (MMTA) is a world-wide industry association whose members are involved in over 49 metals that are not traded on exchanges. The MMTA membership includes around 150 companies from 30 countries that trade in excess of US$10 billion of minor metals annually.

Function
The MMTA serves to benefit and promote the interests of the international minor metals industry and the MMTA membership, comprising companies actively involved in all aspects of the international trade of these metals in all their various forms. The MMTA does not host a marketplace for minor metals or publish price information.

History
The Association was established by London-based metals traders including Peter Robbins in 1973. It is based in Central London on Whitehall Court. The MMTA was established to provide clear trading rules for minor metals and to guide and inform the nascent industry.

Other metal associations
 London Metal Exchange
 London Bullion Market Association
 London Platinum and Palladium Market

References

External links
Minor Metals Trade Association

Organizations established in 1973
Trade associations based in the United Kingdom
Metal industry